First National Bank of Commerce Building, located at 210 Baronne Street in the Central Business District of New Orleans, Louisiana, is a 19-story, -tall skyscraper.
Currently, the building is slated to be home of the Kailas Tower condominium and apartment development, by New Orleans developer Mohan Kailas.

See also
 List of tallest buildings in New Orleans

External links
 First National Bank of Commerce Building on Emporis.com

Skyscraper office buildings in New Orleans